SÜSS MicroTec SE is a supplier of equipment and process solutions for the semiconductor industry and related markets.
The microstructuring systems like photolithography tools are used for manufacturing of processors, memory chips, MEMS, LED and other micro system devices.

SUSS MicroTec is headquartered in Garching bei München, Germany.

The stock ticker is SMHN.DE.

History 

In 1949, Karl Süss founded the company Karl Süss KG to support sales and service for optical devices made by Ernst-Leitz GmbH, later Leica, in Munich, Germany. Then in 1963 the assignment by Siemens to develop a simple photolithography tool marked a change in the strategic direction of the company towards contract manufacturing and engineering. With the creation of the MJB3, the first mask aligner now exhibited in the Deutsches Museum in Munich, the company entered the emerging semiconductor industry. In addition to manual and automatic alignment equipment the product portfolio extended to systems for related wafer processing steps such as development, cleaning and wafer bonding.  The company expanded into the global market with the foundation of its first overseas subsidiaries in the 1980s.

In 1999 under the holding SÜSS MicroTec AG, the SUSS group went public on the German stock exchange. In 2002 all subsidiaries were renamed SUSS MicroTec.

Organization 
In 1980 a production site for wafer bonders was founded in Waterbury, Vermont, US, and in 1989, a production site opened for test systems in Sacka near Dresden, Germany. The acquisition of the French company S.E.T. in 1993 complemented the product portfolio with spin coaters and device bonders, the latter product line was phased out in 2007. 
 
With the acquisition of Image Technology in Palo Alto, California, US, high precision photomasks were provided for the lithographic processes. In 2002 the foundation of SUSS MicroOptics in Neuchatel, Switzerland, brought forward wafer-level produced optical devices such as micro lenses.

With the sale of the test systems division and the purchase of HamaTech APE early in 2010, SUSS MicroTec not only expands its expertise in wet processes but further focuses its core competence on micro structuring of devices.

In 2012 SUSS MicroTec acquires Tamarack Scientific Co. Inc.. Tamarack develops, manufactures and distributes UV projection lithography systems as well as laser micro-structuring tools for the Advanced Packaging, 3D Integration, MEMS and LED markets.

The company has sales offices in the semiconductor markets of Japan, Taiwan, China, Singapore and Korea.

Former CEOs 
Frank P. Averdung and Dr. Per-Ove Hansson were hired from outside the group. Former CEOs include Dr. Franz Richter, Dr. Stefan Schneidewind, Frank P. Averdung, and Dr. Per-Ove Hansson

SUSS MicroTec partnered with Philips Research for developing nanoimprint lithography processes.

References 

 Deutsche Börse (Germann Stock Exchange
 Press Releases
 VLSI Supplier Ranking
 SUSS MicroTec: A 3D Approach
 Advanced mask aligner lithography: new illumination system

Equipment semiconductor companies
Companies based in Bavaria